Firbank Grammar School is an independent, Anglican, day and boarding school, situated in the suburb of Brighton, in the Bayside area of Melbourne, Australia.

Established on 26 April 1909, by the Anglican Archbishop of Melbourne, Henry Lowther Clarke, the school currently caters for approximately 1,200 students. The Early Learning Centre and primary school are co-educational, whilst the secondary school (years 7–12) is for girls only.

Firbank is a member of the Australian Anglican Schools Network, the British Schools and Universities Foundation  and Girls Sport Victoria (GSV). Firbank has close ties with its brother school, Brighton Grammar School, a boys' school. Students of the two schools participate in a number of co-educational activities together such as music and drama.

History

Firbank Grammar School was established as a Christian, day and boarding school for girls in 1909, by the Anglican Archbishop of Melbourne, Henry Lowther Clarke who was left a legacy for educational purposes. The Archbishop purchased 'Gawsworth', a property which stretched between Outer and Middle Crescents, and named the school after Firbank, his birthplace in Westmorland, England. He chose the motto, Vincit Qui Se Vincit ("She conquers who conquers herself") and gave the School his Archbishop crest.

Under the leadership of Maud Cameron, Firbank's first and longest serving Headmistress, enrolments grew and further land was purchased, including the 'Pen-y-bryn' estate and 'Atherstone' in Sandringham. Since its foundation, Firbank has maintained a strong connection with St Andrew's Anglican Church, Brighton where formal school services are held.

Campus
Firbank consists of three educational sections on two campuses: 'Sandringham House', a co-educational primary school in Sandringham offering a quality education; 'Turner House', a primary school for girls; and the Senior School catering for girls only in Years 7 to 12. The houses are Sheppard Tyson, Aylwin Cameron, Tonkin Clarke and Hancock Crowther.

Sport
Firbank is a member of Girls Sport Victoria (GSV). Firbank has competed in rowing since 1992. It has produced many nationally and internationally recognised swimmers.

GSV premierships 
Firbank has won the following GSV premierships.

 Badminton (2) - 2008, 2015
 Diving (18) - 2001, 2003, 2004, 2005, 2006, 2007, 2008, 2009, 2010, 2011, 2012, 2013, 2014, 2015, 2016, 2017, 2018, 2019
 Soccer (4) - 2010, 2015, 2017, 2018
 Swimming - 2004
 Triathlon, Mini (2) - 2019, 2020
 Triathlon, Sprint - 2015

Media
The Brighton campus was one of the sites for filming the 2005 television series We Can Be Heroes: Finding The Australian of the Year, in two episodes of the television production Neighbours in 2007, the film Any Questions for Ben? in 2012, Ja'mie Private school girl in 2013 and Upper Middle Bogan also in 2013.

Notable alumnae
Diana Bryant – Chief Justice of the Family Court of Australia
Jane Bunn – meteorologist, Seven News
Jacqui Cooper – aerial skiing world champion
Judy-Joy Davies – Olympic swimmer and journalist
Beverley Dunn – actress
Mavis Freeman – bacteriologist and biochemist
Jennifer Hansen – former co-presenter, Channel 10 News
Amie Kaufman – New York Times bestselling author
Kirstie Marshall,  – ALP celebrity MP for Forest Hill and former Aerial Skiing World Champion, also went to Mentone Girls' Secondary College
Ida Elizabeth Osbourne,  – founder of A.B.C. Radio's national Children's Session
Thérèse Rein – wife of former Australian Prime Minister Kevin Rudd and founder of employment agency Ingeus
Susan Renouf – Australian socialite
Catherine Skinner – Olympic gold medallist for trap shooting
Jan Wade – Attorney General in Jeff Kennett's government
Shaniera Akram-philanthropist, wife of cricket legend Wasim

See also 
 List of schools in Victoria
Anglican Church of Australia

References

External links 
 
 Brighton Grammar School

Girls' schools in Victoria (Australia)
Boarding schools in Victoria (Australia)
Anglican schools in Melbourne
Educational institutions established in 1909
Junior School Heads Association of Australia Member Schools
1909 establishments in Australia
Alliance of Girls' Schools Australasia
Buildings and structures in the City of Bayside